Acrosomal protein SP-10 is a protein that in humans is encoded by the ACRV1 gene.

This gene encodes a testis-specific, differentiation antigen, acrosomal vesicle protein 1, that arises within the acrosomal vesicle during spermatogenesis, and is associated with the acrosomal membranes and matrix of mature sperm. This gene consists of 4 exons and its alternative splicing generates multiple distinct transcripts, which encode protein isoforms ranging from 81 to 265 amino acids. The longest transcript is the most abundant, comprising 53-72% of the total acrosomal vesicle protein 1 messages; the second largest transcript comprises 15-32%; the third and the fourth largest transcripts account for 3.4-8.3% and 8.7-12.5%, respectively; and the remaining transcripts combined account for < 1% of the total acrosomal vesicle protein 1 message. It is suggested that phenomena of cryptic splicing and exon skipping occur within this gene. The acrosomal vesicle protein 1 may be involved in sperm-zona binding or penetration, and it is a potential contraceptive vaccine immunogen for humans.

References

External links

Further reading

Human proteins